Sri R. Swaminatha Merkondar was an Indian politician and represented the Tiruvaiyaru constituency in the Madras Assembly from 1957-62.

Early life 
R. Swaminatha Merkondar was born in the Koonampatti village of Thanjavur district, he is zamindar of koonampatti and grand child of S. Kumarasamy Merkondar. In the last century Pudupatti, Thanjavur, Sengipatti belongs to koonampatti jameen merkondar family. Koonampatti village is part of korkai nadu during the chola period.

Political career 
R. Swaminatha Merkondar was a member of the Indian National Congress party and represented the Tiruvaiyaru constituency in the Madras Assembly from 1957-62. He served as a chairman of Budalur.

References

Year of birth missing
Possibly living people
Politicians from Chennai
Indian National Congress politicians from Tamil Nadu